Porky's Picnic is a 1939 Warner Bros. Looney Tunes animated cartoon directed by Bob Clampett. The short was released on July 15, 1939, and stars Porky Pig.

Plot
Porky is riding his way over to his girlfriend, Petunia's home. Upon arrival he knocks on her door and asks her if she would like to go on a picnic with him. So she goes upstairs and get her basket. While they are walking they pass a window where Pinkie is asleep but overheard the conversations and decides to tag along.

And so, on their way they see Pinkie and quickly catch him. Porky tells him that if he behaves, he would tell the baby a story. Pinkie pulls the nail out of side-car of Porky's bike, causing it to become separated and both pieces of vehicle go on separate paths. Pinkie has fun while Petunia panics and covers her eyes. After they pass a speeding train, the vehicle re-connects and Porky just finishes his story. Pinkie claims it was the best story he "never" heard and they soon arrive to the park.

Porky decides he wants to take a nap as Pinkie watches a small squirrel. He grabs a pair of scissors and proceeds to chase around the poor squirrel. Petunia manages to grab him and lays him down for a nap next to Porky. As she leaves however, Pinkie gets up and smacks Porky with a big wooden plank. Porky awakes with a start but sees nobody nearby, other than a sleeping Pinkie. As he tries to get back to sleep, Pinkie is about to strike again but Porky catches him and asks what he was about do with the wood plank. Pinkie begins to explain, but ends up smacking him repeatedly with the plank of wood before skipping away.

Porky then grumpily lies on his side as Pinkie skips his way into the zoo, past a sleeping crocodile/alligator. Petunia begins to shout and tells Porky of Pinkie's location in the zoo. Soon Porky finds Pinkie sleeping with a big cat and its babies. Porky sneaks into the cage and quickly tries to escape being eaten by the big cat. He gets out to grab a faint Petunia after putting down Pinkie, then they resume chase until they manage to get the cat stuck in the metal bars. As Porky returns to Petunia he falls into the mud. But Petunia doesn't mind and she kisses him anyway! Seeing the squirrel again, Pinkie prepares to cut it with the scissors. Unfortunately, Pinkie didn't count on the squirrel being prepared this time; having its own smaller plank of wood and the squirrel hits Pinkie with it repeatedly, ultimately the naughty baby is finally punished for his mischief and the cartoon ends.

See also
Looney Tunes and Merrie Melodies filmography (1929–1939)

References

External links

1939 animated films
1939 films
Looney Tunes shorts
Warner Bros. Cartoons animated short films
1930s American animated films
Films scored by Carl Stalling
Porky Pig films
Films about babies
Animated films about squirrels
Picnic films
Films set in parks
Films set in zoos
Films set in 1939